Sympathetic Resonance is a collaborative studio album by singer John Arch and guitarist Jim Matheos (credited as Arch/Matheos), released on September 9, 2011 through Metal Blade Records.

Background
Matheos founded the progressive metal band Fates Warning in 1983, while Arch left the band in 1987 and retired from the music business after having served as lead vocalist on their first three albums. Both musicians reunited on Arch's 2003 EP A Twist of Fate, after which Matheos contacted Arch about re-emerging from retirement, having himself written the first few songs for a new Fates Warning album. Upon Matheos' realization that the next Fates Warning album would be delayed for several years, he opted to record the music with Arch as part of a new album. The three songs initially intended for Fates Warning which ultimately appeared on Sympathetic Resonance were "Neurotically Wired", "Midnight Serenade" and "Stained Glass Sky". Fates Warning's subsequent album, Darkness in a Different Light, was released in 2013.

Critical reception

Trey Spencer at Sputnikmusic gave Sympathetic Resonance a score of 4.5 out of 5, calling it "modern, guitar-driven progressive metal featuring an all-star lineup that manages to avoid falling into a cycle of self-indulgent tangents." He made it a point to stress that the album is neither an "unofficial Fates Warning release" nor "Awaken the Guardian Part II", and that it "sounds nothing like what Fates Warning have been doing lately." Arch's vocals were described as "still as powerful and unique as they've always been" despite his lengthy absence from making full-length music. Spencer also noted that longtime fans of Arch's style would not be disappointed, while also acknowledging a potential adjustment period for new listeners.

Track listing

Personnel
John Arch – vocals
Jim Matheos – guitar, mixing, production
Frank Aresti – additional guitar solos
Bobby Jarzombek – drums
Joey Vera – bass, engineering
Phil Magnotti – engineering, mixing
Alan Douches – mastering

Chart performance

References

External links
"Arch/Matheos | Sympathetic Resonance" at Hard Rock Haven

2011 albums
Metal Blade Records albums